Judy Shepard is an activist.

Judy or Judith Shepard may also refer to:

Judith Shepard (actress), commonly known by married name Judith Chapman

See also
Judy Shepard-Kegl
Judy Shepherd (disambiguation)